"Let Me Go the Right Way" is a 1962 song written and produced by then Motown president Berry Gordy and released as a single by Motown singing group The Supremes. It was the group's fourth single and their second charted record following the dismal reception of their first charted single, "Your Heart Belongs to Me".

Overview

Recording
Built on a frenetic and gritty R&B production, it featured an unpolished raw R&B vocal from Supremes lead singer Diana Ross, despite speculation that the song was led by Florence Ballard (who only led on one brief line - "A go-go right!" - at the beginning). In fact, Ballard, the high soprano in the group, was prominently featured in the background - especially her ad-libs on the singles outro - along with Mary Wilson while Ross sung in her natural register. Written and produced by Berry Gordy, the record talks of a woman who wants her lover to let her "go the right way" in their relationship rather than being "led astray". Featuring energetic vocals from all three ladies, it was the group's first recording and release as a trio following the departure of Barbara Martin. This single would be the last to be produced by Gordy until after the songwriting-producing team of Holland–Dozier–Holland left Motown in late 1967; a year after this release, H-D-H would become the group main producers.

Reception
Performing slightly better than "Your Heart Belongs to Me", the song peaked at number 90 on the Billboard Hot 100 and was the first release by the group to hit the Hot R&B Sides chart, where it peaked at number 26 helping the group to land a spot on the Motortown Revue later on that year.

Personnel
Lead vocals by Diana Ross and Florence Ballard (intro)
Background vocals by Diana Ross, Florence Ballard and Mary Wilson
Produced and written by Berry Gordy
Instrumentation by The Funk Brothers and Marvin Gaye on drums

Chart history

References

1962 singles
1962 songs
The Supremes songs
Songs written by Berry Gordy
Song recordings produced by Berry Gordy
Motown singles